Nawabzada Saifullah Magsi is a Pakistani politician who has been a member of Senate of Pakistan, since March 2012.

Education
He has done Bachelor of Laws from University College London in 2004.

Political career
He was elected to the Senate of Pakistan as a candidate of Pakistan Peoples Party in 2012 Pakistani Senate election.

References

Living people
Pakistani senators (14th Parliament)
Pakistan People's Party politicians
Year of birth missing (living people)
Alumni of University College London